The Essential is a compilation album by Australian group, Divinyls. It was released in 2008.

Track listing 
 "Boys in Town" - 2:54
 "Science Fiction" - 3:32
 "Only Lonely" - 3:15
 "Good Die Young" - 3:40
 "Pleasure and Pain" - 3:52
 "Sleeping Beauty" - 3:41
 "Temperamental" - 4:31
 "Hey Little Boy"	 - :23
 "Punxsie" - 4:16
 "I Touch Myself" -3:48
 "I Ain't Gonna Eat Out My Heart Anymore" - 4:31
 "Wild Thing" - 4:12

Charts 
The album debuted and peaked at number 14 on the ARIA Charts in March 2013, following Chrissy Amphlett's death.

References 

2008 compilation albums
Divinyls compilation albums
EMI Records compilation albums